James K. Darrow (September 25, 1937 – June 8, 1987) was an American basketball player. He was born in Akron, Ohio. A 5'10" (178 cm), 170 lb (77 kg) guard, Darrow starred at Bowling Green State University. He was drafted by the St. Louis Hawks of the National Basketball Association and played five games with them during the 1961–62 NBA season, scoring twelve points. He previously played for the Akron Goodyears in the National Industrial Basketball League.

Darrow was inducted into the Ohio Basketball Hall of Fame in 2018.

References

External links
NBA career statistics
BGSU Hall of Fame entry 

1937 births
1987 deaths
All-American college men's basketball players
Amateur Athletic Union men's basketball players
Basketball players from Akron, Ohio
Bowling Green Falcons men's basketball players
Cleveland Pipers players
Guards (basketball)
St. Louis Hawks draft picks
St. Louis Hawks players
American men's basketball players